Mount Pinatubo is an active stratovolcano in the Zambales Mountains, located on the tripoint boundary of the Philippine provinces of Zambales, Tarlac and Pampanga, all in Central Luzon on the northern island of Luzon. Its eruptive history was unknown to most before the pre-eruption volcanic activity of early 1991.  Pinatubo was heavily eroded and obscured from view by dense forests which supported a population of several thousand indigenous Aetas.

Pinatubo is most notorious for its VEI-6 eruption on June 15, 1991, the second-largest terrestrial eruption of the 20th century after the 1912 eruption of Novarupta in Alaska.
Complicating the eruption was the arrival of Typhoon Yunya, bringing a lethal mix of ash and rain to towns and cities surrounding the volcano. Predictions at the onset of the climactic eruption led to the evacuation of tens of thousands of people from the surrounding areas, saving many lives. Surrounding areas were severely damaged by pyroclastic surges, pyroclastic falls, and subsequently, by the flooding lahars caused by rainwater re-mobilizing earlier volcanic deposits. This caused extensive destruction to infrastructure and changed river systems for years after the eruption. Minor dome-forming eruptions inside the caldera continued from 1992 to 1993.

The effects of the 1991 eruption were felt worldwide. It ejected more particulate into the stratosphere than any eruption since Krakatoa in 1883. Over the following months, the aerosols formed a global layer of sulfuric acid haze.

Geography

Near Mount Pinatubo are former military bases that were maintained by the United States. The volcano is near to about 6 million people.

History
It is part of a chain of volcanoes which lie along the western side of the island of Luzon called the Zambales Mountains.

Pinatubo belongs to the Cabusilan sub-range of the Zambales Mountains, which consists of Mount Cuadrado, Mount Negron, Mount Mataba and Mount Pinatubo. They are subduction volcanoes, formed by the Eurasian Plate sliding under the Philippine Mobile Belt along the Manila Trench to the west. Mount Pinatubo and the other volcanoes on this volcanic belt arise due to magmatic occlusion from this subduction plate boundary.

Pinatubo is flanked on the west by the Zambales Ophiolite Complex, which is an easterly-dipping section of Eocene oceanic crust uplifted during the late Oligocene. The Tarlac Formation north, east and southeast of Pinatubo consists of marine, nonmarine and volcanoclastic sediments formed in the late Miocene and Pliocene.

The most recent study of Mount Pinatubo before the activities of 1991 was the overall geological study in 1983 and 1984 made by F. G. Delfin for the Philippine National Oil Company as part of the surface investigations of the area before exploratory drilling and well testing for geothermal energy sources in 1988 to 1990. He recognized two life histories of the mountain, which he classified as "ancestral" and "modern" Pinatubo.

Ancestral Pinatubo

Activity of Ancestral Pinatubo seems to have begun about 1.1 million years ago and probably ended tens of thousands of years or more before the birth of "modern" Pinatubo. Much of the rugged land around the present volcano consists of remnants of "ancestral" Pinatubo. It was an andesite and dacite stratovolcano whose eruptive activity was much less explosive than modern Pinatubo. Its center was roughly where the current volcano is.

Some of the nearby peaks are the remnants of ancestral Pinatubo, left behind when the softer parts of the old mountain slopes were eroded by weathering. Ancestral Pinatubo is a somma volcano with modern Pinatubo as the new cone.
Mount Dorst, to the east, is part of the dip slope of the ancestral Pinatubo. Several mountains near modern Pinatubo are old satellite vents of ancestral Pinatubo, forming volcanic plugs and lava domes. These satellite vents were probably active around the same time as the ancestral volcano and include the domes of Mount Negron, Mount Cuadrado, Mount Mataba and the Bituin and Tapungho plugs.

Modern Pinatubo
 c. 33,000 BC: After a long period of dormancy, Modern Pinatubo was born in Ancestral Pinatubo's cataclysmic and most explosive eruptions, estimated to be five times larger than the June 1991 eruption. The total volume of volcanic material ejected during the eruptions is unknown. The removal of so much material from the underlying magma chamber resulted in the Tayawan caldera. The violent eruptive period started by the eruption is referred to by Delfin as the Inararo Eruptive Period, named after a village that was destroyed in the 1991 eruption.

Later eruptions of modern Pinatubo occurred episodically and lasted for periods much shorter than the repose intervals between them. Subsequent eruptions and eruptive period occurred about:
c. 15,000 BC (Sacobia Eruptive Period)
c. 7000 BC (Pasbul Eruptive Period). Its eruptions were as energetic, if not as voluminous as the Inararo eruptions. 
c. 4000–3000 BC (Crow Valley Eruptive Period). This and the Mara-unot period's eruptions were smaller than the Inararo eruptions but about two to three times as big as that of 1991 based on the pyroclastic flow runout distances and depths of valley filling.
c. 1900–300 BC (Maraunot Eruptive Period)
c. AD 1500 (Buag Eruptive Period). Its eruptions were roughly the same size as those of 1991.

Some eruptive periods have lasted decades and perhaps as much as several centuries and might appear to include multiple large explosive eruptions.

The maximum size of eruptions in each eruptive period though has been getting smaller through the more than 35,000-year history of modern Pinatubo, but this might be an artifact of erosion and burial of older deposits. The oldest eruption of modern Pinatubo, Inararo, was also its largest.

The 1991 eruption was among the smallest documented in its geologic record.

The volcano has never grown very large between eruptions, because it produces mostly unwelded, easily erodible deposits and periodically destroys the viscous domes that fill its vents. After the Buag eruption (c. 1500 AD), the volcano lay dormant, its slopes becoming completely covered in dense rainforest and eroded into gullies and ravines. The c. 500-year repose though between the Buag and present eruptive periods is among the shorter repose periods recognized in its geologic history.

1991 eruption

A small blast at 03:41 PST on June 12 marked the beginning of a new, more violent phase of the eruption. Friction in the up-rushing ash column generated abundant volcanic lightning.

In March and April 1991, magma rising toward the surface from more than  beneath Pinatubo triggered small volcano tectonic earthquakes and caused powerful steam explosions that blasted three craters on the north flank of the volcano. Thousands of small earthquakes occurred beneath Pinatubo through April, May and early June and many thousand of tons of noxious sulfur dioxide gas were also emitted by the volcano.

From June 7 to 12, the first magma reached the surface of Mount Pinatubo. Because it had lost most of the gas contained in it on the way to the surface, the magma oozed out to form a lava dome but did not cause an explosive eruption. However, on June 12, millions of cubic yards of gas-charged magma reached the surface and exploded in the reawakening volcano's first spectacular eruption.

The ash cloud from this climactic eruption rose  into the atmosphere. At lower altitudes, the volcanic ash was blown in all directions by the intense cyclonic winds of a coincidentally occurring typhoon, and winds at higher altitudes blew the ash southwestward. A blanket of ash and larger pumice lapilli blanketed the countryside. Fine ash fell as far away as the Indian Ocean and satellites tracked the ash cloud several times around the globe.

Following the climactic eruption of June 15, 1991, activity at the volcano continued at a much lower level, with continuous ash eruptions lasting until August 1991 and episodic eruptions continuing for another month.

Later eruptions

Activity at the volcano remained low until July 1992 when a new lava dome started growing in the caldera. Volcanologists suspected that further violent eruptions could be possible, and some areas were evacuated. However, the eruption was only minor. The last eruption of Mount Pinatubo took place in 1993.

Lake Pinatubo

The 1991 caldera afterwards filled with water from annual monsoon rains and a crater lake, Lake Pinatubo, was formed. In 1992, a growing lava dome formed an island, which was eventually submerged by the lake.

An estimated 9,000 people were once again evacuated from surrounding areas in case a large flood was accidentally triggered. Workers cut a  notch in the crater rim and drained about a quarter of the lake's volume.

Recent activity

On July 26, 2011, a 5.9 magnitude earthquake struck close to Pinatubo; however, no major damages or casualties were reported.

On March 4, 2021, the PHIVOLCS raised alert level 1 over Mount Pinatubo after reporting an increase on its seismic activity. 1,722 volcanic earthquakes were also recorded within the vicinity of the volcano since January 2021.

On August 11, 2021, PHIVOLCS downgraded Mt. Pinatubo's Alert Level 1 to Level 0, due to "continued decrease in earthquake activity and a return to baseline seismic parameters".

PHIVOLCS said it noted a "significant decrease" in volcanic earthquakes, with a total of 104 quakes or an average 2 - 3 events per day recorded from July 1 - August 1, 2021.

On November 30, 2021, PHIVOLCS reported a weak explosion occurred on Mt. Pinatubo between 12:09 p.m. and 12:13 p.m., which produced a plume. The agency later confirmed it was a phreatic explosion produced by hydrothermal fluids near the surface, rather than a magmatic eruption.

Cultural history
The word pinatubo could mean "fertile place where one can make crops grow", or could mean "made to grow", in Sambal and Tagalog, which may suggest a knowledge of its previous eruption in about 1500 AD. There is a local oral tradition suggestive of a folk memory of earlier large eruptions. An ancient legend tells of Bacobaco, a terrible spirit of the sea, who could metamorphose into a huge turtle and throw fire from his mouth. In the legend, when being chased by the spirit hunters, Bacobaco flees to the mountain and digs a great hole in its summit showering the surrounding land with rock, mud, dust and fire for three days; howling so loudly that the earth shakes.

History among Aetas
Aeta elders tell many stories about the history of the mountain, the best known being that it was once a Batung Mabye (Kapampangan language for "living stone"). It was said to have been planted on a kingdom by a displeased sorcerer but relocated by a hero. The mountain was soon turned into the abode of Apo Namalyari ("The lord of happenings/events"), the pagan deity of the Sambal, Aetas and Kapampangans living on the Zambales range.

It was said to comprise the whole mountain range until Sinukuan of Mount Arayat (the god of the Kapampangans) became a strong rival of Namalyari.  Their fight, which took place over the center plains, shattered the mountain into smaller bodies and Mount Arayat lost its center peak. Other versions have it that Pinatubo's peak shattered because of Namalyari's immense fury in an attempt to teach humans the meaning of fear and show how misdeeds will be punished.

According to the native elders, Apo Namalyari induced the June 1991 eruption because of displeasure toward illegal loggers and Philippine National Oil Company executives who performed deep exploratory drilling and well testing on the volcano looking for geothermal heat from 1988 to 1990.  Discouraging results from the wells forced the abandonment of the prospect 13 months before the April 2, 1991 explosions.

Aetas granted ownership of Pinatubo
After being driven away by the 1991 eruption of Mount Pinatubo, in May 2009 some 454 Aeta families in Pampanga were given the first clean ancestral land ownership on Mount Pinatubo with the Certificate of Ancestral Domain Title (CADT) by the National Commission on Indigenous Peoples (NCIP), the government agency that deals with issues concerning indigenous people of the Philippines.  The approved and declared net land area of  covers the barangays of Mawakat and Nabuklod in Floridablanca, Pampanga, plus a portion of San Marcelino, Zambales, and a portion of Barangay Batiawan in Subic, Zambales.

On January 14, 2010, some 7,000 Aeta families from Zambales were officially granted the Certificate of Ancestral Domain Title (CADT)  covering the Zambales side of Pinatubo which includes the summit and Lake Pinatubo, officially becoming their lutan tua (ancestral land).

Having the land title will protect them from others – including foreigners – exploiting their land without compensation and consent to the indigenous tribes. In the past, the Aetas had to contend with mining companies, loggers, and recently, tourist companies who earn from Mount Pinatubo but do not compensate the local tribes.

Ancestral domain titles are awarded to a certain community or indigenous group who have occupied or possessed the land continuously in accordance with their customs and traditions since time immemorial. They have the legal right to collectively possess and to enjoy the land and its natural resources to the exclusion of others.

In popular culture

Long before Mount Pinatubo became famous for its cataclysmic eruption, Philippine president Ramon Magsaysay, a native of Zambales, named his C-47 presidential plane Mt. Pinatubo. The plane crashed into Mount Manunggal in Cebu province in 1957, killing the president and twenty-four others on board.

The shape of Mount Pinatubo's caldera inspired New Clark City Athletics Stadium in Capas, Tarlac.

Hiking activity
The caldera formed and Lake Pinatubo has, since June 15, 1991, become a tourist attraction with the preferred route through Barangay Santa Juliana in Capas, Tarlac.

See also

 List of active volcanoes in the Philippines
 List of inactive volcanoes in the Philippines
 List of volcanic eruptions by death toll
 List of potentially active volcanoes in the Philippines
 Timeline of volcanism on Earth

Notes

References

 
 Decker, R. and Decker, B. (1997) Volcanoes, 3rd edition, WH Freeman, New York.
 
 
 
 
 
 
 
 Dhot, S. Mt Pinatubo Safety.

External links

 Mount Pinatubo page
 Fire and Mud: Eruptions and Lahars of Mount Pinatubo, Philippines, United States Geological Survey site
 "Weather effects of the 1991 eruption" EOS Volcanology.
 "The Cataclysmic 1991 Eruption of Mount Pinatubo, Philippines". United States Geological Survey site
 Pinatubo, Philippines (volcanic images)
 Entry for Pinatubo in the Smithsonian Institution's Global Volcanism Program (GVP)

Active volcanoes of the Philippines
Calderas of Southeast Asia
Landforms of Pampanga
Landforms of Tarlac
Landforms of Zambales
Mountains of the Philippines
Stratovolcanoes of the Philippines
Subduction volcanoes
VEI-6 volcanoes
Volcanic crater lakes
Volcanoes of Luzon
Holocene stratovolcanoes
Pleistocene stratovolcanoes